Mikolaj Radziwiłł (c. 1492–1530) was the Bishop of Samogitia of Radziwill Family. He was son of Mikolaj Radziwiłł, Grand Chancellor of Lithuania.

1490s births
1530 deaths
Mikolaj 03
Lithuanian Roman Catholic bishops